Dennis Dengsø Andersen (born 16 May 1978) is a Danish sailor. He competed in the 49er event at the 2004 Summer Olympics.

References

External links
 

1978 births
Living people
Danish male sailors (sport)
Olympic sailors of Denmark
Sailors at the 2004 Summer Olympics – 49er
Place of birth missing (living people)